Kemper Crabb is an American musician. His style is reminiscent of 'Olde English,' and his music has been described as 'Celtic, Medieval, intelligent and sacred'. He has produced over 8 albums, with The Vigil (1982) selling over one hundred thousand copies on vinyl. He is also an Episcopal priest.

He has been a member of the groups ArkAngel, Atomic Opera, and Caedmon's Call.

He has been an associated act with The Phlegmatics and a guest musician on In the Company of Angels.

Discography 

 Look Up - as Redemption  (1972)
 Warrior - as ArkAngel (1980)
 The Vigil - (1982)
 Illumination - as RadioHalo (1992)
 A Medieval Christmas - (1996)
 Live at the Rivendell Cafe - (1996)
 Flotsam and Jetsam - (2000)
 Live at Cornerstone - (2000)
 Downe in Yon Forrest - (2009)
 Reliquarium - (2010)

Guest appearances 

 Be Exalted – John Michael Talbot and friends (1986)
 Faith Hope Love – King's X (1990)
 Penguin Dust – Atomic Opera (1998)
 Gospel Cola – Atomic Opera (2000)

References

External links 

 
 A Medieval Christmas (Downe in the Heart of Texas)

Musicians from Houston
Year of birth missing (living people)
Living people
Place of birth missing (living people)